RPM was a Canadian magazine that published the best-performing singles of Canada from 1964 to 2000. 1996 saw twenty-three songs reach the number-one spot in Canada. Alanis Morissette achieved both the first and last number-one singles of the year: "Hand in My Pocket" and "Head over Feet", respectively. Six different artists reached number one for the first time in 1996: Joan Osborne, Everything but the Girl, Collective Soul, Melissa Etheridge, BoDeans, and the Tragically Hip.

Canadian singer Alanis Morissette was the most successful act of 1996 in Canada, reaching number one with four different singles between January and November: "Hand in My Pocket", "Ironic", "You Learn", and "Head over Feet"—all from her album Jagged Little Pill. Although "Ironic" spent six weeks at number one, it was the second highest-selling single of the year; "You Learn" came in first place, topping the RPM Singles Chart for three nonconsecutive weeks in July. Mariah Carey, Hootie & the Blowfish, and Bryan Adams were the only other acts to top Canada's chart with multiple singles.

Aside from Morissette, three other Canadian acts reached number one: the Tragically Hip, Bryan Adams, and Celine Dion. Morissette's "Head over Feet" spent the most weeks at the top in 1996, staying there for seven weeks. Eric Clapton stayed five weeks at number one with "Change the World", as did John Mellencamp with "Key West Intermezzo (I Saw You First)". Hootie & the Blowfish spent four weeks at number one with two hits: "Time" and "Old Man & Me (When I Get to Heaven)", while Mariah Carey, Everything but the Girl, and Bryan Adams each logged three weeks at number one with their chart-topping singles.

Chart history

Notes

See also
1996 in music
List of number-one albums of 1996 (Canada)

References

External links
 Read about RPM Magazine at the AV Trust
 Search RPM charts here at Library and Archives Canada

 
1996 record charts
1996